Elementary is an American procedural drama television series that presented a contemporary update of Sir Arthur Conan Doyle's character Sherlock Holmes. It was created by Robert Doherty and starred Jonny Lee Miller as Sherlock Holmes and Lucy Liu as Dr. Joan Watson. The series premiered on CBS on September 27, 2012. It was set and filmed primarily in New York City. With 24 episodes per season, by the end of season two, Jonny Lee Miller became the actor who had portrayed Sherlock Holmes in the most episodes on television or in film.

The show follows Holmes, a recovering drug addict and former consultant to Scotland Yard, as he assists the New York City Police Department in solving crimes. His indifference to police procedure often leads to conflict with Captain Thomas Gregson (Aidan Quinn), although the two still remain respectful of one another. Holmes is accompanied by Dr. Joan Watson (Lucy Liu), who initially acts as his sober companion. She is a former surgeon and was hired by Sherlock's father to help him in his rehabilitation. They eventually begin to work together on his cases; in time she becomes Holmes's apprentice and later his professional partner. The series also features Holmes's ongoing conflict with his nemesis and former lover Jamie Moriarty (Natalie Dormer). Other supporting roles include Jon Michael Hill as Detective Marcus Bell, Rhys Ifans as Sherlock's brother Mycroft Holmes, and John Noble as Sherlock's father Morland Holmes.

Before the series premiered, it was met with some criticism, given it followed closely on the heels of the BBC's modern adaptation Sherlock. After the premiere, it was picked up for a full season and later an extra two episodes. The season two premiere was partly filmed on location in London. The series was well received by critics, who praised the performances, writing, novel approach to the source material, and fresh modern twist detailed throughout the show's New York–based adaptation down to the size of the brownstone first seen in the series premiere. The seventh and final season premiered on May 23, 2019, and concluded on August 15, 2019.

Plot
Following his fall from grace in London and a stint in drug rehabilitation, a modern-day version of Sherlock Holmes relocates to Manhattan, where his wealthy father forces him to live with a sober companion, Dr. Joan Watson. Formerly a successful surgeon until she lost a patient, Watson views her current job as another opportunity to help people. However, Sherlock is nothing like her previous clients. He informs her that none of her expertise as an addiction specialist applies to him and that he has devised his own post-rehab regimen:  resuming his work as a police consultant in New York City. Watson has no choice but to accompany her mercurial new charge on his jobs.

Over time, Sherlock finds her medical background helpful, and Watson realizes she has a talent for investigation. Sherlock's police contact, New York Police Captain Thomas Gregson, knows from previous experience working with Scotland Yard that Sherlock is brilliant at solving cases and welcomes him as part of the team. The investigative group also includes Detective Marcus Bell, an investigator with sharp intuition and intimidating interrogation skills. Although initially skeptical of Holmes and his unorthodox methods, Bell begins to recognize Sherlock as an invaluable asset in solving his cases.

Episodes

Cast and characters

Main
 Jonny Lee Miller as Sherlock Holmes. Holmes is a former Scotland Yard consultant who now lives in New York City after completing drug rehabilitation. He is a deductive genius with a variety of unusual interests and enthusiasms that assist him in his investigations. Feeling that the more interesting criminal cases are in America, he stays in New York. He contacts an old associate, Captain Thomas Gregson of the New York City Police Department (NYPD), to resume his work as a consulting detective. He is forced by his father to live with Dr. Joan Watson, his "sober companion" who provides him with aftercare. Miller's Holmes displays many canonical aspects of Sir Arthur Conan Doyle's character, while his familial relations, most notably his resentment for his father, have been added into his narrative. In between seasons 2 and 3, Sherlock spends eight months in Britain working for MI6 and returns to New York in "Enough Nemesis to Go Around" with a new protégé, Kitty Winter. At the conclusion of season 3, Sherlock suffers a relapse, but his father's connections allow him to resume working for the NYPD. In season 4, Morland reveals that Sherlock's mother, May Holmes, was an opiate addict like him. In the last few episodes of season 5, he suffers from severe unexplained headaches that affect his concentration, as well as hallucinating about a woman who is based on his mother; the season 6 premiere reveals that he is suffering from post-concussion syndrome, requiring him to be put on a carefully balanced system of medication, as well as taking on assorted mental activities to try and help his brain heal, albeit hampered by Sherlock's 'need' to use his work to escape his past addictions. By the beginning of season 7, Sherlock is officially recovered, although he notes that one more hit to his head could have serious consequences for his health. In the penultimate episode of the series, following his father's murder at the hands of Odin Reichenbach, Sherlock has a showdown with Reichenbach in which he fakes his death, allowing Reichenbach to be arrested and finally convicted of his numerous crimes some time later. In the series finale, after three years in hiding, he returns after his nemesis / former lover Jamie Moriarty lures him out by making a fake threat against Joan's life. He later opts to stay with Joan as she undergoes cancer treatment, and the two partner up again a year later when she recovers. With 24 episodes per season, by the end of season 2, Jonny Lee Miller became the actor who had portrayed Sherlock Holmes the most times in television and/or film, overtaking Jeremy Brett (with 41 television episodes) and Eille Norwood (with 47 silent films).
 Lucy Liu as Dr. Joan Watson (née Yun). Holmes' sober companion, Joan was previously a successful surgeon, which adds to her complement of skills; she had grown close to a patient and his family, and when she accidentally nicked his vena cava during surgery and he bled out in seconds, she gave up her medical career. She comes to Holmes when she is hired by his father as his sober companion, to help him remain abstinent after his release from rehabilitation. After her contracted time is finished, she remains on after lying to Sherlock that his father had continued to retain her services. He gradually comes to value her input and grows to trust her as she helps him come to terms with his life after addiction. Eventually, Sherlock reveals that he found out that Joan is no longer being paid to stay as a companion. He offers her a position as an apprentice, telling her how much she means to him and how she helps him to focus. Joan accepts and starts her training as a detective with Sherlock. After Sherlock leaves for London, Joan becomes the go-to consulting detective for the 11th Precinct, while also taking on more traditional private investigator-type cases that Sherlock eschews. The two resume working together after Sherlock returns to New York, although Joan takes the occasional case independent of Sherlock. Joan has a brother, Oren, and a half-sister, Lin Wen (née Yun). In the final two seasons, Joan starts to take steps to become a mother, and in the series finale, three years after Sherlock fakes his death, she is revealed to have adopted a son named Arthur. During this time, she has also written and published a book recounting her partnership with Sherlock and continued to consult for the NYPD. Near the end of the episode, she reveals that she has cancer and is starting chemotherapy, prompting Sherlock to stay with her through her recovery.
 Aidan Quinn as Captain Thomas "Tommy" Gregson. He heads the 11th Precinct. He was previously assigned to Scotland Yard to observe their Counter-Terrorism Bureau, where he crossed paths with Sherlock and was impressed with his work. He genuinely likes Holmes, and the two have a mutual respect, with Sherlock describing Gregson as an investigator he both respects and admires, though Gregson admits that Sherlock is a "pain in the ass". In season 2, Gregson separates from his wife of over 20 years, Cheryl, and they are divorced by season 3. In "Rip Off" (season 3, episode 5), it is revealed that his daughter, Hannah (Liza J. Bennett), is an ambitious patrol officer with the 15th Precinct; by season 6, Hannah has been promoted to sergeant. In "Absconded" (season 3, episode 23), Gregson is offered a promotion to Deputy Chief due to the outstanding work of his unit, but despite hints that some higher-ups want him to accept the offer, he decides to remain where he is, as he values his current role and ability to interact with people more than the possibilities offered by the promotion. It is also mentioned in that episode that he was put in charge of the Major Case Squad at age 40. In season 4, Gregson begins dating Paige Cowan, a former detective who quit the NYPD after her unit was accused of taking bribes; they briefly break up after Joan runs into them at a restaurant, as Paige claims she does not want people to think ill of Gregson, even if she was not involved in her unit's actions, but Joan soon learns that Paige actually has multiple sclerosis and convinces Gregson to give the relationship another chance; the two later marry. During season 6, when Bell contemplates a transfer to the United States Marshals Service, Gregson observes that Holmes, Watson and Bell make a good partnership because Bell stops them from bending the rules too far when they are conducting investigations. In the beginning of season 7, Gregson is shot and wounded while investigating a cold case, which leads to the revelation of a conspiracy helmed by social media mogul Odin Reichenbach. In the series finale, it is revealed that he retired from the NYPD a year earlier to spend as much time as possible with Paige, who eventually succumbed to her MS. 
 Jon Michael Hill as Detective First Grade/Captain Marcus Bell. Bell is a junior officer with the 11th Precinct with whom Sherlock and Joan prefer working. While initially against the idea of getting help from Sherlock, he comes to recognize Sherlock's abilities and readily takes advice from him. Gregson explicitly observes that Bell is a good partner for Sherlock and Joan as he recognizes when circumstances require them to bend the rules (such as by entering properties of suspects without legal warrants) without letting them break anything that would compromise later court cases. He is briefly reassigned to an observational role in season 2 after sustaining a potentially serious shoulder injury at the hands of a hostile witness Sherlock had questioned earlier; this strains his relationship with Sherlock, but a confrontation with Holmes helps Bell overcome the psychological issues that were hindering his recovery and he soon returns to his old role. In season 4, Bell considers taking the sergeant's exam for the increase in pay to help support his ailing mother. In season 6, Bell is offered a position with the United States Marshals Service and decides to put in an application for transfer upon completing his master's degree. However, he later passes up the job after Sherlock takes the blame for the murder of serial killer Michael Rowan to protect both Joan and Gregson's daughter Hannah from prosecution, and then again when Gregson is shot and critically wounded at the start of season 7 to help investigate the conspiracy. In the series finale, Bell is revealed to have married and become a father, and has been promoted to captain of the 11th following Gregson's retirement.
 John Noble as Morland Holmes (season 4; guest: seasons 6-7). Sherlock's much loathed father arrives in New York after Sherlock suffers a relapse at the end of season 3. He works as an influential business consultant, making arrangements for various companies to achieve their goals regardless of what they might be, with Sherlock describing him as a 'neutral' party in that he has no concern about the consequences of his clients' goals so long as they are achieved. He decides to stay in New York for unknown long-term reasons involving Sherlock, with Joan speculating from independent research that he suffered serious stomach damage from a failed murder attempt two years before, and may believe that he is being targeted again. With a view to resolving the threat, at the end of season 4, he accepts the leadership of Moriarty's organization, intending to dismantle the group from within and thereby shield his son and Joan from any further harm. Morland later returns on two separate occasions: once during season 6, following his older son Mycroft's death, when he and Sherlock mend any remaining fences between them, and then again during season 7, where Sherlock recruits his help to bring down Odin Reichenbach. However, after Morland's machinations cripple Reichenbach's company and nearly result in him being ousted, Reichenbach retaliates by having Morland murdered by one of his own associates, setting the stage for a final showdown with Sherlock.
 Nelsan Ellis as Shinwell Johnson (season 5). He is a previous patient of Joan's and an ex-convict and gang member for the SBK (South Bronx Killas). He and Joan become acquainted once more when he is released from prison and placed on probation. During his time on probation, Joan helps him settle back into his life outside of prison while also assisting him in his attempt to build a relationship with his daughter. He was briefly an unofficial informant for an FBI agent and is now an official informant for the Bronx Gang Squad. His relationship with Sherlock and Joan falters when Sherlock discovers that Shinwell was responsible for the death of a friend of his during his original time in the SBK, but Shinwell writes a confession for this crime as he is preparing to bring down the gang, only to be killed by another member of the SBK. (Eight weeks after his death episode aired, Ellis died in Brooklyn at age 39.)
 Desmond Harrington as Michael Rowan (season 6): A recovering addict who becomes impressed with Sherlock's methods of dealing with his addiction and becomes his friend and leaning post as he tackles his post-concussion syndrome. He is later revealed to be a murderer after burying a woman's body in an unknown location; eventually, he is revealed to be a serial killer, who has killed an estimate of more than a dozen women in multiple states, and has credited Sherlock with convincing him to focus on his "work" (i.e., killing) in order to kick his heroin addiction. When Sherlock's health problems diminish his investigative abilities, Michael leaves New York for a time to allow him to recover. He returns near the end of the season where, after he is revealed to have murdered the addict husband of one of his friends years earlier, he attacks Joan, only to flee after being seriously wounded, and is later found dead; the murder is later revealed to have been committed by Gregson's daughter Hannah as retaliation for Michael's earlier killing of her roommate.
 James Frain as Odin Reichenbach (season 7). The renowned tech mogul hires Sherlock and Joan to find who threatened to kidnap his niece. It is soon learned that he made up the claim as a way to test the two, believing that he had found kindred spirits due to their willingness to go the distance to protect the innocent. It is also revealed that he was indirectly responsible for triggering the events that led to Gregson's shooting at the beginning of the season. Odin later reveals to Sherlock his intention to use his enormous resources, both online and offline, to create a system that prevents future crimes by flushing out the would-be-perpetrators and having them killed before they can carry out any offenses. However, despite Reichenbach clearly wanting to do good, Sherlock feels that his system does not work, citing how he killed a bus driver who was ranting on social media about her plans to kill her passengers; a brief study of the woman's media history confirmed that she had made similar rants in the past at the same time of year and never followed through. While presenting himself as willing to listen to Sherlock's input, Reichenbach soon proves himself extremely ruthless in proving that his system works, to the point of having a target and the target's parents killed in a staged murder-suicide (after Sherlock had averted the threat by convincing the target to take a non-violent approach to his problems), and then later having Sherlock's father Morland murdered after the latter assists his son in crippling Reichenbach's company and nearly getting him ousted. The latter action later results in a showdown between the two, wherein Sherlock fakes his murder at Reichenbach's hands in order to finally see him arrested for his crimes. In the series finale, after a lengthy trial, Reichenbach is finally convicted of numerous murders and other crimes related to his conspiracy, and is sentenced to 148 years in prison.

Recurring

 Ophelia Lovibond as Kitty Winter. She is Sherlock's newest protégée, whom he brings with him from London after leaving MI6. She was initially tasked with spying on Watson until being discovered. Sherlock tends to be strict with her but admires her detective skills. Kitty's real name is unknown, as she was kidnapped and raped in London prior to meeting Sherlock and had changed her name in an effort to forget her ordeal. Her character is based on Kitty Winter in Doyle's "The Adventure of the Illustrious Client". After confronting and disfiguring her rapist, she decides to leave the United States to avoid arrest and to go somewhere where she could use the skills that Sherlock and Watson had taught her.
 Ato Essandoh as Alfredo Llamosa. Sherlock's NA sponsor is a recovering addict himself. Alfredo is also a reformed expert car thief. He is now paid by various car companies to test their security systems, and he occasionally lets Sherlock try out his own skills on them. Alfredo is one of Sherlock's few real friends, but does not hesitate to criticize Sherlock when he makes a poor decision and pushes him to continue his rehab regimen, including becoming a sponsor himself. He also teaches Joan how to bypass automotive security. Sherlock later 'fires' Alfredo as his sponsor so that he can help him as a friend.
 Rhys Ifans as Mycroft Holmes. Sherlock's older brother lives in London. He and Sherlock had a very bitter relationship in the past, but Mycroft begins taking steps to reconcile with his brother and becomes good friends with Joan. He owns a chain of restaurants called Diogenes and is an excellent cook. It is later revealed that Mycroft is in the employ of MI6; it becomes necessary for him to fake his death in "The Grand Experiment", an act that his brother feels shows a lack of faith in Sherlock's ability to find another solution. It is revealed in season 6 that Mycroft has died of a brain aneurysm. Sherlock briefly grieves for him when he learns of this, regretting not being able to make up with his brother before his death. 
 Natalie Dormer as Irene Adler / Jamie Moriarty. As Irene, she is the great love of Sherlock's life during his life in Britain. She conceals from him that she is also Moriarty, the brilliant criminal mastermind and leader of a shadowy, powerful worldwide criminal organization. She fakes her death to draw his investigations away from her criminal activities. This causes Sherlock's already established drug use to escalate out of control. Despite Sherlock discovering her true identity and engineering her imprisonment, the two continue to have conflicting feelings for each other – Sherlock noting during a conversation with Bell that "the love of [his] life is an unrepentant homicidal maniac" — and great respect for each other's intellectual powers. She orders her organization not to harm him. She also gains a certain amount of respect for Joan, as the latter's ability to fool her is what gets her arrested; when Joan's life is threatened by drug kingpin Elana March, she arranges the criminal's death in her cell. At the end of Season 4, Morland Holmes takes over her organization with the goal of dismantling it. She plays a major unseen role in the series finale, supposedly plotting against Sherlock, only for it to turn out to be a false alarm. Three years later, Sherlock attends her funeral, although he expresses doubt to Watson that Moriarty is actually dead. Series creator Robert Doherty confirmed in an interview that Moriarty is still alive.
 Sean Pertwee as Gareth Lestrade. When Sherlock was based in London, he worked with Lestrade, who was then a member of the Metropolitan Police. Due to Sherlock's insistence on working in anonymity (to avoid generating resentment among his colleagues), Lestrade took credit for solving the cases that they worked on together. Lestrade is clearly not in Sherlock's league, and his overzealousness and impulsiveness tend to impair his judgement; however, he is a skilled detective in his own right.
 Candis Cayne as Ms. Hudson. An expert in ancient Greek, she is a kept woman and muse for various wealthy men. Sherlock allows her to stay at the brownstone after a breakup, and she subsequently agrees to clean for them once a week as a source of income. Sherlock initially attempts to make Joan pay for the work, as she complains about his messiness, but she refuses and they settle on sharing the expense. Ms. Hudson is seen in single episodes in each of the first three seasons (episodes 19, 45, 55), and mentioned in numerous others through season 4.
 Betty Gilpin as Fiona "Mittens" Helbron. Helbron is a brilliant software engineer for a technology company called Pentillion, known as 'Mittens' in the hacker community. She is on the autism spectrum, and is a cat lover (hence her hacker moniker). She is briefly considered a suspect in one case (episode 81), but later assists Sherlock and Joan in their investigation. She later contacts Joan for assistance in another matter, and has a romantic relationship with Sherlock for a while (episodes 84 and 90).
 Jordan Gelber as Dr. Eugene Hawes, M.E. Hawes is a New York City medical examiner who provides Sherlock and Joan with details relating to murders. He and Sherlock are regular chess partners ("the first Thursday of the month" is mentioned in the episode "Hounded"). A concealed bomb detonates in the city morgue ("Down Where the Dead Delight"), severely injuring him and killing the woman he is interested in; as a result, he develops a drug addiction. After noticing the indicators, Sherlock implores him to get help ("Hounded"). He takes a leave of absence to recover, but returns to active duty in the season 5 episode "Ill Tidings".

Characters from the Sherlock Holmes stories
Elementary often has characters who are loosely based on characters from the original Sherlock Holmes stories by Sir Arthur Conan Doyle.

Development
Writer and producer Robert Doherty created the show. Doherty has commented that it was Carl Beverly who "initially was the one who brought up the possibility of developing a Sherlock show." Beverly spoke about the relationship between Sherlock and Watson in the show in July 2012:

Casting
Liu was cast by February 2012. That July, she said that Watson is not "someone who's on the sideline; she's his sober companion, she's engaged in him, not the mystery, ... From that point on you get to see how that blossoms out. The foot-in-the-bucket and that kind of Watson happens because in entertainment, there's got to be a sidekick. In this case, that's not the direction we're going in. Ask me in six episodes and if I have a foot in a bucket then we'll have a discussion."

Relationship to BBC's Sherlock
Sherlock, a contemporary reworking of the Sherlock Holmes story, premiered in the UK in July 2010 and in the U.S. in October 2010. The British show has since sold to more than 200 territories. In January 2012, shortly after CBS's announcement they had ordered the pilot for Elementary, Sherlock producer Sue Vertue told newspaper The Independent, "[W]e understand that CBS are doing their own version of an updated Sherlock Holmes. It's interesting, as they approached us a while back about remaking our show. At the time, they made great assurances about their integrity, so we have to assume that their modernised Sherlock Holmes doesn't resemble ours in any way, as that would be extremely worrying." The following month Vertue said that "We have been in touch with CBS and informed them that we will be looking at their finished pilot very closely for any infringement of our rights."

CBS made a statement on the issue: "Our project is a contemporary take on Sherlock Holmes that will be based on Holmes, Watson and other characters in the public domain, as well as original characters. We are, of course, respectful of all copyright laws and will not infringe on any stories or works that may still be protected."

Creator Robert Doherty discussed comparisons between Sherlock and Elementary the following July, pointing out that a tradition of updated Holmes stories dates back to the Basil Rathbone films of the 1940s, and that he did not think it was the case that Elementary took anything from Sherlock, which he described as a "brilliant show" having watched its first series. Several months later, Lucy Liu confirmed the producers of the UK Sherlock were shown the pilot, "saw how different it was from theirs," and were "okay with it now."

Production
Some interior scenes were shot at Silvercup Studios in Long Island City. Some exterior shots of Sherlock's brownstone were filmed in Harlem, which was a stand-in for Brooklyn Heights. Several episodes have been filmed in Whitestone, Queens, most recently on 11 August 2017.

Reception
The first season was met with positive reviews from critics, who highlighted the show's novel approach to the source material, the writing quality, and the performances and chemistry found between its two leads and supporting cast. Season one holds an 85% approval rating on aggregate review site Rotten Tomatoes, based on 62 reviews, with an average score of 7.69/10. The site's consensus reads: "It may not appeal to purists, but Elementary provides a fresh new spin on Sherlock Holmes, and Jonny Lee Miller shines in the title role." It also holds a Metacritic score of 73 out of 100 based on 29 sampled reviews, indicating "generally favorable reviews". The Guardian's Phelim O'Neill felt that "Jonny Lee Miller and Lucy Liu make it a double act to rival Sherlock" and noted that "the pacing feels perfect and the details are light: viewers can keep up with the investigation and feel involved, not something every investigative show achieves". Lori Rackl of the Chicago Sun-Times gave the pilot episode 3 stars out of 4, and said "While the latest interpretation doesn't live up to the British import, it's still more entertaining than your typical CBS procedural." Hank Stuever of The Washington Post gave it a B+ and felt that the show "exhibits enough stylish wit in its mood and look to quickly distinguish itself from the latest British Sherlock series (seen on PBS)".

Season 2 was met with equally positive reviews. It holds a 100% approval rating on Rotten Tomatoes based on 17 reviews, with an average score of 8.29/10. The site's consensus reads, "With the introduction of Mycroft and Lestrade, Elementary successfully extends into the Sherlock Holmes canon in season two." Several critics praised Rhys Ifans for his portrayal of Mycroft Holmes, with Myles McNutt of The A.V. Club calling his casting choice "inspired" and praising him for being able to match with Miller's "bitterness" and praising the premiere episode overall - he later went on to offer positive words on Ifans' performance in the finale episodes pertaining to Mycroft's story, despite finding flaws in the overall arc. Noel Kirkpatrick of TV.com also praised Ifans, saying he "very finely" played the role. The episode "The Diabolical Kind" also attracted wide acclaim, with many singling out the emotional depth and Natalie Dormer's performance as Moriarty. McNutt called Moriarty's presence in both the episode and the series as a whole "refreshingly dominant" and also praised the storytelling and dialogue, singling out several bits of witty humor in the episode. The episode has a 9.0 rating on TV.com with Kirkpatrick claiming Dormer was "having a ball" playing the role of Moriarty and saying there was "good stuff" to be had in her. Kirkpatrick also appreciated the season as a whole for its development of Holmes' character, as well as the performance of the cast.

Season 3 continues Elementarys trend of a positive critical response. It holds a 100% approval rating on Rotten Tomatoes based on 14 reviews, with an average score of 8.32/10. The site's consensus reads, "Elementarys third season leverages the estrangement between Sherlock and Joan to further explore both characters, proving that Sir Arthur Conan Doyle's creations still have room to grow". IGN praised the evolution of Watson as a character in the show, saying "While other Holmes/Watson incarnations focus on Watson being a friend, medic, and put-upon backup, Elementary has elevated the character into someone with loftier aspirations." Particular praise was given to Ophelia Lovibond for her performance as Sherlock's protege Kitty Winter, with critics feeling she was a welcome addition to the cast. The episode "The One That Got Away" garnered critical acclaim for its resolution of Kitty's story, as well as the performances of Miller and Lovibond. The Season 3 finale was met with positive reviews. IGN's Matt Fowler gave the Season finale: "A Controlled Descent" an 8.3/10 saying that "The one-two punch of Sherlock both giving into his anger and his heroin lust was a scorching way to send us out of Season 3".

Season 4, like previous seasons, was met with a positive critical response. It holds a 100% approval rating on Rotten Tomatoes based on 15 reviews, with an average score of 7.45/10. IGN's Matt Fowler gave the season 4 premiere episode "The Past Is Parent" a 7.3/10. He praised Joan and Sherlock's deepening friendship and John Noble's performance as Sherlock's father, but criticized the fact that the episode did not capitalize on the crisis from the Season 3 finale, saying that "while there wasn't anything necessarily bad about "The Past Is Parent," it just failed to capitalize off the momentum from last season".

Ratings

Season 2

Season 3

Season 4

Season 5

Season 6 
{{Television episode ratings|title1=An Infinite Capacity for Taking Pains|viewers15=3.02|dvr14=0.4|dvrv14=2.51|total14=0.7|totalv14=5.89|title15=How to Get a Head|date15=August 12, 2018|rs15=0.4/2|dvr15=0.4|rs14=0.3/2|dvrv15=2.20|total15=0.8|totalv15=5.22|title16=Uncanny Valley of the Dolls|date16=August 13, 2018|rs16=0.4/2|viewers16=3.48|dvr16=0.4|viewers14=3.38|date14=August 6, 2018|total16=0.8|total12=0.8|totalv11=5.75|title12=Meet Your Maker|date12=July 23, 2018|rs12=0.4/2|viewers12=3.45|dvr12=0.4|dvrv12=2.56|totalv12=6.01|title14=Through the Fog|title13=Breathe|date13=July 30, 2018|rs13=0.4/2|viewers13=3.33|dvr13=0.4|dvrv13=2.37|total13=0.8|totalv13=5.70|dvrv16=2.47|totalv16=5.95|dvrv11=2.40|dvrv20=2.50|total19=1.0|totalv19=6.03|title20=Fit to Be Tied|date20=September 10, 2018|rs20=0.4/2|viewers20=3.17|dvr20=0.5|total20=0.9|dvr19=0.5|totalv20=5.67|title21=Whatever Remains, However Improbable|date21=September 17, 2018|rs21=0.5/2|viewers21=3.10|dvr21=0.4|dvrv21=2.48|total21=0.9|dvrv19=2.73|viewers19=3.30|title17=The Worms Crawl In, the Worms Crawl Out|title18=The Visions of Norman P. Horowitz|date17=August 20, 2018|rs17=0.4/2|viewers17=3.34|dvr17=0.5|dvrv17=2.69|total17=0.9|totalv17=6.03|date18=August 27, 2018|rs19=0.5/2|rs18=0.5/2|viewers18=3.57|dvr18=0.4|dvrv18=2.63|total18=0.9|totalv18=6.20|title19=The Geek Interpreter|date19=September 3, 2018|total11=0.8|dvr11=0.4|date1=April 30, 2018|total4=1.0|totalv3=6.88|title4=Our Time Is Up|date4=May 21, 2018|rs4=0.5/2|viewers4=4.17|dvr4=0.5|dvrv4=2.51|totalv4=6.68|dvrv3=2.44|title5=Bits and Pieces|date5=May 28, 2018|rs5=0.4/2|viewers5=3.94|dvr5=0.5|dvrv5=2.70|total5=0.9|totalv5=6.64|total3=1.1|dvr3=0.5|date6=June 4, 2018|date2=May 7, 2018|rs1=0.6/3|viewers1=4.74|dvr1=0.5|dvrv1=2.50|total1=1.1|totalv1=7.24|title2=Once You've Ruled Out God|rs2=0.6/3|viewers3=4.43|viewers2=4.59|dvr2=0.4|dvrv2=2.38|total2=1.0|totalv2=6.97|title3=Pushing Buttons|date3=May 14, 2018|rs3=0.6/3|title6=Give Me the Finger|rs6=0.6/3|viewers11=3.35|date10=July 2, 2018|rs9=0.5/2|viewers9=3.97<ref name="6.09">{{#invoke:Cite web||url=http://tvbythenumbers.zap2it.com/daily-ratings/monday-final-ratings-june-25-2018/|archive-url=https://web.archive.org/web/20180627005339/http://tvbythenumbers.zap2it.com/daily-ratings/monday-final-ratings-june-25-2018/|url-status=dead|archive-date=June 27, 2018|title=Ninja Warrior,' other originals hold, CBS reruns adjust down: Monday final ratings|last=Porter|first=Rick|work=TV by the Numbers|date=June 26, 2018|access-date=June 26, 2018}}</ref>|dvr9=0.5|dvrv9=2.63|total9=1.0|totalv9=6.60|title10=The Adventure of the Ersatz Sobekneferu|rs10=0.4/2|title9=Nobody Lives Forever|viewers10=3.89|dvr10=0.5|dvrv10=2.72|total10=0.9|totalv10=6.61|title11=You've Come a Long Way, Baby|date11=July 16, 2018|rs11=0.4/2|date9=June 25, 2018|totalv8=7.00|viewers6=4.41|dvr7=0.4|dvr6=0.4|dvrv6=2.63|total6=1.0|totalv6=7.05|title7=Sober Companions|date7=June 11, 2018|rs7=0.6/3|viewers7=4.35|dvrv7=2.37|total8=1.0|total7=1.0|totalv7=6.72|title8=Sand Trap|date8=June 18, 2018|rs8=0.6/3|viewers8=4.54|dvr8=0.4|dvrv8=2.46|totalv21=5.58}}

 Season 7 

Awards and nominations

Broadcast
In Australia, Elementary premiered on Network Ten on 3 February 2013. The second season started airing on 23 March 2014. The third season started airing on 2 March 2015.

In Canada, it airs simultaneously on Global. In New Zealand, it premiered on Prime on 27 February 2013.

In the United Kingdom and Ireland, the series was acquired by Sky Witness (previously Sky Living), a subscription channel. It debuted on 23 October 2012. The second season premiered on 22 October 2013. The third season began airing on 11 November 2014. Season 1 premiered on free-to-air TV in the UK on Sky-owned channel Pick on 6 February 2017.

On 3 February 2013, Elementary was broadcast after Super Bowl XLVII as the official lead-out program. The episode drew 20.8 million viewers, despite running out of prime time in the Eastern time zone as a result of a game delay.

Tie-in media
In February 2015, Titan Books published the first official tie-in novel, The Ghost Line, written by Adam Christopher. A second novel, also written by Adam Christopher and titled Blood and Ink, was published on 26 April 2016.

See also
 The Return of Sherlock Holmes – a 1987 television film featuring Holmes in a contemporary setting and a Jane Watson, also produced by CBS
 1994 Baker Street: Sherlock Holmes Returns'' – a 1993 television film featuring Holmes in a contemporary setting, also produced by CBS

Notes

References

External links

 
 
 

2010s American crime drama television series
2010s American mystery television series
2012 American television series debuts
2019 American television series endings
American detective television series
CBS original programming
English-language television shows
Fictional portrayals of the New York City Police Department
Sherlock Holmes television series
Super Bowl lead-out shows
Television series by CBS Studios
Television shows filmed in New York (state)
Television shows set in New York City